The Mannesmann Tower was a tower on the Hanover fairground in Hanover, Germany. The Mannesmann Tower hosted aerials for mobile phone services.

It was demolished on 21 June 2012 due to its poor condition.

See also 
 List of towers

External links 
 
 http://www.skyscraperpage.com/diagrams/?b59507

Communication towers in Germany
Buildings and structures in Hanover
1954 establishments in West Germany
Towers completed in 1954
2012 disestablishments in Germany
Buildings and structures demolished in 2012